Denkte is a municipality in the district of Wolfenbüttel, in Lower Saxony, Germany. It governs the villages of Gr. Denkte, Kl. Denkte, Neindorf and Sottmar.

References

External links
 

Wolfenbüttel (district)